Eleonore "Loni" Arnault ( Nest, 4 August 1915 – 2 October 1990), known professionally by her maiden name of Loni Nest, was a German actress. Born in Berlin, she was a child star of German silent films in the 1920s. She was filmed for the first time at the age of four weeks.

Life and film career
After more than 40 movies, she ended her movie career in 1928 at the age of 13. In 1933 she played in one last movie in France. Her whereabouts after 1933 remained unknown for several decades, but it was eventually discovered that she died at the age of 75 on 2 October 1990 in the French town Nice.

In 2014, the website Forever Missed published an obituary that ostensibly revealed that Nest had died in Hawaii in 2014 at the age of 98. It also described details of Nest's life after she left Germany and moved to America. Various websites including the Internet Movie Database quickly adopted this information. It was soon discovered, however, that both the time and location of her death as well as the details about her later life were a hoax. According to the German newspaper Die Welt, German film historian Toni Schieck had discovered years before that Nest's sister Ursula had moved to the United States and died in Florida in 2007. Through her family, Schieck discovered that Nest had married and taken the last name Arnault. She moved to France where she died at the age of 75 in Nice.

Filmography

1918: The Story of Dida Ibsen
1919: Die Ehe der Frau Mary
1919: Opium
1919: Harakiri
1920: Kämpfende Gewalten oder Welt ohne Krieg
1920: Der Reigen – Ein Werdegang
1920: Patience
1920: Johannes Goth
1920: Der Golem, wie er in die Welt kam
1920: The Guilt of Lavinia Morland
 The Wandering Image (1920)
1921: Man Overboard
1921: Ein Erpressertrick
1921: Schloß Vogelöd
1921: Violet
1921: Die Minderjährige – Zu jung fürs Leben
1921: Parisian Women
1921: The Convict of Cayenne
1921: The Pearl of the Orient
1921: Sturmflut des Lebens
1922: Alone in the Jungle
1922: Sunken Worlds
1922: Tabitha, Stand Up
1922: A Dying Nation (2 parts)
1922: Aus den Erinnerungen eines Frauenarztes (2 parts)
1923: Quarantäne
1923: Tragedy of Love
1923: Fräulein Raffke
1923: The Little Napoleon
1923:  Black Earth
1924:  Two Children
1924: Mother and Child
1924: The Evangelist
1925: Fire of Love
1925: Die Prinzessin und der Geiger
1925: Die freudlose Gasse
1925: A Song from Days of Youth
1928: The Saint and Her Fool
1928: The Story of a Little Parisian
1933: L'Épervier

References

External links
 

1915 births
1990 deaths
German film actresses
German silent film actresses
Actresses from Berlin
German child actresses
20th-century German actresses
German emigrants to France